John Hay Steel (1895 – 1 April 1953) was a Scottish professional footballer who played in the Football League for Nelson and Brentford as a full back. He also played in his native Scotland for Queen's Park, Third Lanark and Arthurlie.

Career statistics

Honours 
Nelson
 Football League Third Division North: 1922–23

References

1895 births
Scottish footballers
Association football defenders
Third Lanark A.C. players
Nelson F.C. players
Brentford F.C. players
English Football League players
1953 deaths
Arthurlie F.C. players
Footballers from Glasgow
Queen's Park F.C. players
Arsenal F.C. players
Scottish Football League players